Manuel Medina Ortega (born 1935 in Arrecife de Lanzarote (Las Palmas)) is a Spanish politician and Member of the European Parliament for the Spanish Socialist Workers' Party, part of the Party of European Socialists. Medina also served in the Spanish Congress of Deputies representing Las Palmas from 1982 to 1987 when he resigned upon election to the European Parliament.

External links
Biography at Spanish Congress site
Official biography
Manuel Medina, Estado de Derecho y clivage político

1935 births
Living people
Members of the 2nd Congress of Deputies (Spain)
Members of the 3rd Congress of Deputies (Spain)
MEPs for Spain 1986–1987
MEPs for Spain 1987–1989
MEPs for Spain 1989–1994
MEPs for Spain 1994–1999
MEPs for Spain 1999–2004
MEPs for Spain 2004–2009
People from Arrecife
Spanish Socialist Workers' Party MEPs